Ben Kadi is a commune in the Cercle of Banamba in the Koulikoro Region of south-western Mali. The principal town lies at Samakele. In 1998 the commune had a population of 7606.

References

Communes of Koulikoro Region